Geoffrey Wright (born 1959) is an Australian film director and screenwriter, who gained cult success with the 1992 film Romper Stomper, starring Russell Crowe.

In 1994 he directed the gritty suburban thriller film Metal Skin, starring Ben Mendelsohn, and later directed the teen horror film Cherry Falls, starring Brittany Murphy. In 2006 he adapted Shakespeare's Macbeth for film, starring Sam Worthington and Lachy Hulme.

Filmography

Film

Television

References

External links

1959 births
Living people
Australian screenwriters
Film directors from Melbourne